Battleground 6: Napoleon in Russia is a 1997 computer wargame developed and published by TalonSoft. It the sixth entry in the Battleground series.

Development
During development, TalonSoft reported trouble securing Russian music for Napoleon in Russia. The game was distributed by Broderbund, as part of a new deal by TalonSoft.

Reception

Napoleon in Russia was a runner-up for Computer Gaming Worlds 1997 "Wargame Game of the Year" award, which ultimately went to Sid Meier's Gettysburg! The editors wrote that Napoleon in Russia "sent the Battleground engine out in style".

Reviews
Computer Gaming World - Aug, 1997
GameSpot - Jul 09, 1997
CD-Action - Feb, 1998
Game.EXE - May, 1997
GameStar (Germany) - Dec, 1997
PC Player (Germany) - Dec, 1997

References

External links

1997 video games
Computer wargames
Multiplayer and single-player video games
Napoleonic Wars video games
TalonSoft games
Turn-based strategy video games
Video games developed in the United States
Video games set in Russia
Windows games
Windows-only games